Two of a Kind is an album by American jazz pianist John Hicks and bassist Ray Drummond recorded in 1986 and 1987 and released on the Theresa label. The 1992 Evidence CD reissue added three bonus tracks.

Reception
Allmusic awarded the album 3 stars stating "They were a true duo, each player conscious of the other but able to make his own way".

Track listing
 "I'll Be Around" (Alec Wilder) - 4:41		
 "Take the Coltrane" (Duke Ellington) - 4:42		
 "Very Early" (Bill Evans) - 7:31		
 "I'm Getting Sentimental Over You" (Ned Washington, George Bassman) - 7:03		
 "For Heaven's Sake" (Elise Bretton, Sherman Edwards, Donald Meyer) - 6:07		
 "Come Rain or Come Shine" (Harold Arlen, Johnny Mercer) - 5:14		
 "A Rose Without a Thorn" (Abdul Salim) - 7:33
 "Without a Song" (Edward Eliscu, Billy Rose, Vincent Youmans) - 6:08		
 "A Nightingale Sang in Berkeley Square" (Eric Maschwitz, Manning Sherwin) - 4:29		
 "Parisian Thoroughfare" (Bud Powell) - 3:00		
 "Springtime Fantasy" (John Hicks) - 3:57

Personnel
John Hicks - piano
Ray Drummond - bass

References

Theresa Records albums
John Hicks (jazz pianist) albums
Ray Drummond albums
1989 albums